Tolofuaivalelei Falemoe Leiataua is a Samoan politician and former Cabinet Minister. He served as Speaker of the Samoan Legislative Assembly from 2006-2011.  He was a member of the Human Rights Protection Party.

Leiataua was first elected to Parliament in 1996 and served briefly as Minister of Posts Office and Telecommunications before losing his seat in September of that year.  He was re-elected in the 2001 general election and was appointed Deputy Speaker. In 2006 he became Speaker of the Legislative Assembly.

Leiataua's term as Speaker was marked by battles to prevent the formation of parties to rival the HRRP.  In 2009, following the formation of the Tautua Samoa Party, he invoked anti-party-hopping laws to evict all nine of its members from the House. The MP's were later reinstated by the Supreme Court of Samoa. In 2010 the government passed new laws forbidding MPs from joining or declaring their support for political parties or organizations with political aims other than the party they were elected for.  In March 2010 Speaker Leiataua invoked these laws to deprive three MPs of their seats for supporting Tautua Samoa.

He was re-elected at the 2011 and appointed Minister of Women's Affairs. He lost his seat at the 2016 election. He had initially planned to run in the April 2021 election, but withdrew his candidacy in October 2020.

References

External links
 Profile at the Samoan Fono.

Year of birth missing (living people)
Samoa, Legislative Assembly
Living people
Members of the Legislative Assembly of Samoa
Speakers of the Legislative Assembly of Samoa
Government ministers of Samoa
Human Rights Protection Party politicians